Ballyduff may refer to:

In the Republic of Ireland
Ballyduff, Co. Waterford with a postal address of Kilmeaden in the east of the county
Ballyduff, County Kerry
Ballyduff, County Waterford near Lismore, County Waterford
Ballyduff, County Wexford, located between Gorey and Ferns, County Wexford
Ballyjamesduff, County Cavan, often called Ballyduff for short

In Canada
A community in Manvers Township, Ontario

In Northern Ireland
Ballyduff, County Antrim, a townland in County Antrim, Northern Ireland